The 2013 World Mountain Running Championships were held on 8 September in Krynica-Zdrój, Poland.  It was the 29th edition of the championships, organised by the World Mountain Running Association (WMRA). The competition featured four races, with senior and junior (under-19) races for both men and women. A total of 329 runners from 39 nations were present at the start of the races.

The men's course was 13.56 km long with an incline of 1,630 m. The women's and junior men's course had a distance of 9.1 km with an ascent of 1,090 m. The junior women's race was 4.6 km in length with a climb of 550 m. Each of the races had an individual and team race element

Ten nations reached the medal table, Italy being the most successful country with three gold medals, two silver medals and one bronze. Uganda followed with two gold medals, one silver medal and one bronze medal. Great Britain won one gold medal, two silver medals and one bronze medal. The USA took one gold medal and one silver medal, the Czech Republic one gold medal. Turkey won one silver and two bronze, Slovenia one silver and Austria, Russia and Ireland with one bronze medal each.

Results

Senior men

Total: 129 participants

Total: 19 teams

Senior women

Total: 79 participants

Total: 19 teams

Junior men

Total: 66 participants

Total: 16 teams

Junior women

Total: 40 participants

Total: 14 teams

Medal table

Participating nations

References

Results
In-depth results

External links
Official championships website
Official WMRA website

World Mountain Running Championships
World Mountain Running Championships
World Mountain Running Championships
International athletics competitions hosted by Poland